Soba is a neighbourhood of Korhogo, a city in northern Ivory Coast. It is located in the southeast quarter of the city.

Soba was a commune until March 2012, when it became one of 1126 communes nationwide that were abolished.

Notes

Former communes of Ivory Coast
Korhogo